Ronald Mason Harvey (26 October 1933) was a rugby union player who represented Australia.

Harvey, a fly-half, was born in Waratah, New South Wales and claimed a total of 2 international rugby caps for Australia.

He also played a single first-class cricket match for New South Wales as a right-handed batsman.

See also
 List of New South Wales representative cricketers

References

1933 births
2011 deaths
Australian rugby union players
Australia international rugby union players
Australian cricketers
New South Wales cricketers
Rugby union players from Newcastle, New South Wales
Rugby union fly-halves